High Gear is the first studio album by the American hard rock band Howe II, released in 1989 through Shrapnel Records. Howe II was a short-lived group fronted by guitarist Greg Howe and his brother Albert Howe on vocals.

Critical reception

Andy Hinds at AllMusic reviewed the album positively, saying that "The songs on High Gear are good, the riffs are killer, and the execution is flawless." He praised Greg Howe's guitar playing as "more effective than ever; focused like a laser, his brilliant solos drive home the point of the songs rather than being the point of the songs" and likened Albert Howe's vocals to David Lee Roth. More praise went to the band overall: "The entire band plays with an articulate, inspired precision and energy that is truly awesome." Journalist Martin Popoff described the album as "a rhythmic good time metal party" and the production as "a bit blocky, but vital like Van Halen".

Track listing

Personnel
Howe II
Albert Howe – lead vocals
Greg Howe – guitar, background vocals, mixing, co-producer
Vern Parsons – bass, background vocals
Joe Nevolo – drums, background vocals

Guest musicians
Mike Varney – guitar solo (track 9), producer
Jason Becker – guitar solo (track 9)

Production

Recorded at Prairie Sun Recording Studios, Cotati, California

Steve Fontano – producer, engineer, mixing
Joe Marquez – assistant engineer
George Horn – mastering at Fantasy Studios, Berkeley, California
Kerry Doyle – cover art guitar customization

References

Greg Howe albums
1989 debut albums
Shrapnel Records albums
Albums produced by Mike Varney